General Rivera may refer to:

Fructuoso Rivera (1784–1854), Uruguayan general 
Isabelo Rivera (born 1956), U.S. Army National Guard brigadier general
Pedro N. Rivera (born 1946), U.S. Air Force brigadier general

See also
Sergio José Rivero (born 1964), Venezuelan National Guard general